Ministry of Environmental Protection and Natural Resources of Ukraine is the main authority in the system of central government of Ukraine responsible for ecological monitoring and development of the country. As a government ministry it exists since 1991 being formed during dissolution of the Soviet Union.

History
This government institution was established back in 1967 as the State Committee of Nature Protection. In 1978, it was merged into the All-Union State Committee under the same name centered in Moscow. Following declaration of independence, the state committee was reorganized into the Ministry of Environmental Protection of Ukraine. In 1995-2000, the ministry also supervised the nuclear safety as Ministry of Environmental Protection and Nuclear Safety of Ukraine. In 2000, it switched to its current name until 2003 and recovered it again in 2010. In 2003-2010 it was the Ministry of Environmental Protection of Ukraine.

On 29 August 2019 the Honcharuk Government merged the ministry into the Ministry of Energy and Coal Mining. But the succeeding Shmyhal Government re-created (the ecology ministry) on 27 May 2020. The new returning post of ecology Minister was filled when Roman Abramovsky was appointed by parliament on 19 June 2020.

Structure
The ministry is headed by minister of Ecology and Natural Resources, first deputy, and other deputies to assist the minister. Ministry elects several state administrations representatives to coordinate operation of selected government companies.

Central Body
 Minister
 State agencies
 Administration of organizational-analytical support to Minister
 Control-Revisionary Section
 Collegiate of Ministry
 First Deputy
 Department of State Ecological Policy and International Actions
 Legal Department
 Section in relationship with press media and public
 Administration in property, job security, material-technical and informational support
 Chief Specialist in Mobilization
 Division of controls and checks in execution of acts and decrees of higher bodies of state power
 Division of regime-secret actions
 Deputy – Head of Central Body
 Department of Ecological Security
 Department of Economics and Finances
 Administration of State Ecological Monitoring
 Section of state expertise
 Section of human resources
 Section of accounting and financial report
 Division of tender procedures
 Deputy
 Department of Conservation Affairs
 Department in Security of Natural Resources and Eco-Network

State agencies
 State Service of Geology and Resources (official website if inaccessible )
 Nadra Ukrainy (official website)
 State Agency of Water Resources (official website)
 State Agency of Ecological Investments (official website)
 State Ecological Inspection (official website)

Other institutions
 Ukrainian science-research institute of ecological problems, Kharkiv (official website)
 Ukrainian science center of sea ecology (Odessa) (official website)

Ministers

List of Ministers of Ecology and Natural Resources

List of Ministers of Energy and Environmental Protection

List of Ministers of Environmental Protection and Natural Resources

See also
Cabinet of Ministers of Ukraine
Committee of the Verkhovna Rada on issues of ecological policy

References

External links 
 Official Website of the Ukrainian Ministry of Ecology

Ecology
Ecology
Ukraine, Ecology
Ukraine, Ecology
Ukraine, Ecology